NSAI may refer to: 

Nashville Songwriters Association International, songwriting preservation and education society
National Spatial Address Infrastructure, a United Kingdom government initiative
National Standards Authority of Ireland, the ISO member body for the Republic of Ireland
Nonsteroidal anti-inflammatory drug, a group of analgesic drugs
Nonsteroidal aromatase inhibitor, a class of drugs used in treatment of breast cancer